Lukoil Baltija is a chain of petrol stations in the Baltic states owned by Russia-based Lukoil.

In 2012, Lukoil Baltija was listed as the 4th largest company in Lithuania by annual revenue.

In 2015, Lukoil signed a deal to sell its 37 stations in Estonia to Aqua Marina, a subsidiary of Olerex. In late 2015 and early 2016, Lukoil announced that its 230 stations are being sold in Latvia, Lithuania and Poland to Austria-based AMIC Energy Management.

In 2017, Lukoil Baltija stations were leased.

References

External links 
 Lukoil Baltija Official website

Lukoil
Oil companies of Lithuania
1992 establishments in Lithuania
Companies based in Mažeikiai